Carl Josef Thiel (9 July 1862 − 23 July 1939) was a German organist, church musician and professor of music.

Life 
Born in Oleśnica Mała, Thiel was born as the son of the trained miller and grain merchant August Thiel and his second wife Regina Thiel, née Gebel. His mother's two brothers, Carl and Ignatz Gebel, worked as principal teachers and choir directors in Ziębice and Parchwitz. Thiel received his first musical instruction from the cantor Scholz of his home parish. He was baptized catholic and grew up in Lower Silesia in simple circumstances. Nevertheless, he was able - just like his brother Reinhold, who was five years younger - to complete training as a primary school teacher. As a junior teacher Thiel taught at a village school in Koszęcin, where he had his own grand piano, and a little later in Zabrze(Mikultschütz). At that time Thiel also played viola. After four and a half years as a teacher and a study leave granted to him in Berlin, he gave up the profession in 1888 and devoted himself to church music.

Musical education 
From 1888 to 1891 he was instructed by Heinrich Bellermann in historical musicology and counterpoint.

In 1890 Thiel founded the Kirchliche Singschule, a choir consisting of members - mainly teachers - of all Catholic parishes in Berlin. After his studies he was appointed "etatmäßiger Hilfslehrer" for Gregorian chant at the institute in 1891. Among other things, he devoted himself intensively to the Gregorian chant, because in his opinion, of all music genre, this was best suited to the liturgy. In 1892 he started as a church musician in the parish church St. Sebastian, Berlin in Gesundbrunnen, where he already found a church choir. In 1898, the Kirchliche Singschule was renamed to Verein für klassische Kirchenmusik, which consisted of the St. Sebastian choir. At the turn of the century Thiel lived in Charlottenburg.

Teaching Activities 
After two years of collaboration with his teacher and the director of the Royal Institute of Church Music, Hermann Kretzschmar, Thiel was appointed his representative in 1909. Together with Hermann Kretzschmar he founded the Madrigal Choir of the Academy and appeared several times as its conductor. He had to give up his activity as a church musician in St. Sebastian on 30 June 1910 due to the workload resulting from his teaching activities. He was appointed Professor of Music and, after Hermann Kretzschmar's illness, became Director of the now renamed State Academy for Church Music and School Music from 1922.

In the 1920s, Thiel was one of the most important music educators in German musical life. From 1925 until his death he was a member of the Preußische Akademie der Künste in Berlin.

End of life 

After three years there he was appointed by bishop Michael Buchberger and was also appointed director as successor to Karl Weinmann, who had already been provisionally represented by Peter Griesbacher. He held this position voluntarily and held it until the end of his life in 1939. By organizing a commemoration ceremony for Max Reger and a celebration of German culture with Richard Wagner's Parsifal, Anton Bruckner's Te Deum and works by Max Reger, he and his student Theobald Schrems in 1933 strongly supported newer music.

Thiel died unexpectedly during a spa stay in Bad Wildungen of a stroke at the age of 77.

Activities 
As the government's bell expert, in 1916, Thiel saved several parishes from the confiscation and melting down of their church bells because of their beautiful sound or because of their artistic value.

The church musician Theobald Schrems passed the state examination for church and school music with him from 1925 to 1928.

In Regensburg the curriculum of the church music school was fundamentally redesigned under Thiel's direction. He increased the duration of studies and tightened the entrance and final examinations, so that the church music school finally received state recognition. Furthermore, he united the Regensburg Church Music School with the Regensburger Domspatzen of the Regensburg Cathedral. During the period of National Socialism Thiel took over the direction of the Fachschaft VI (Catholic Church Music) in the Reichsmusikkammer from 1933.

Thiel dedicated his life to the promotion and cultivation of Gregorian chant. However, he was by no means limited to the occupation with church music and was also engaged as a musicologist.

Thiel composed and arranged sacred vocal music and published older a-cappella music. Some of his works still belong to the repertoire of many church choirs today.

Awards 

In the Royal Music Institute of Berlin, a bronze bust of him was erected in the 1920s, which can still be seen today in the auditorium of this building which, as an Institute for Church Music is now part of the Berlin University of the Arts.

He has also been awarded the following honours:
 1893: Winner of the Felix Mendelssohn Bartholdy Prize.
 1928: appointed honorary member of the Association of Berlin Protestant Church Musicians
 1932: appointed honorary member of the Allgemeiner Cäcilien-Verband für Deutschland of the Archbishopric of Breslau
 1934: Appointment as knight of the Order of St. Gregory the Great by Pope Pius XI

Work

Music

Choral work 
Selection in alphabetical order:

 12 lateinische Kirchengesänge, including:
 Domine non sum dignus
 Hodie Christis natus est
 Improperien
 Haec Dies
 Lauda Sion
 Abendlied from opus 8
 Acht Mariengesänge for four-part mixed choir, opus 16
 Adeste fideles, setting of "Adeste fideles" for seven-part choir, from Zwei Weihnachtslieder, opus 7
 Adorabo und Domine Deus, two motets for the parish fair, opus 13
 Ave Maria in Venedig, a setting of Ave Maria for women and men choir, opus 15, 1892
 Bonifatius-Messe, opus 14
 Bußpsalm for mixed choir and orchestra (organ ad libitum), opus 22
 Christ ist erstanden, a setting of "Christ ist erstanden"
 setting of "Der Morgenstern ist aufgedrungen"
 Deutsche Improperien for solo quartet and double choir, opus 28
 Domine Deus
 Erlöser-Messe, opus 25
 Erste Pfingstpredigt, opus 26
 Es sungen drei Engel
 setting of "Freu dich, Erd und Sternenzelt"
 Geistliche Szene for soprano solo, male choir and mixed choir, opus 6
 Gott ist die Liebe
 setting of "Ich steh an deiner Krippen hier" for five-part choir
 setting of "In dulci jubilo"
 setting of "Jauchzet dem Herrn alle Welt" for seven-part mixed choir with organ or brass (2 trumpets and 3 trombones), opus 21
 Jesus und der Seesturm, opus 11
 Krippenlied for four-part mixed choir a cappella, opus 7
 Laudate Dominum, Motette im alten Stil nach Motiven von Giovanni Gabrieli, opus 32
 Loreto-Messe, opus 17, 1897
 Maria: Kantate in sechs Bildern after Friedrich Wilhelm Weber's "Marienblumen", for solos, choir and orchestra, opus 5
 Die Mutter des Herrn, Annunciation with Magnificat
 Unter der Palme, Flight to Egypt
 Maria Spinnerin
 Nach Golgatha
 Voll der Schmerzen
 Die Mutter mit dem Sohne, Coronation of Mary
 Missa brevis for four-part mixed choir a cappella, opus 12, 1894
 Missa choralis with organ and three trombones, opus 18
 Missa simplicissima, opus 20
 Offertorien from the Commune Sanctorum for mixed choir opus 24
 Ostergesang for four-part mixed choir, opus 30
 Preis sei Gott im höchsten Throne
 Segne und behüte uns in Deiner Güte for five-part mixed choir a cappella
 Täuschung from opus 8
 Vier größere Motetten, opus 9:
 Jauchzet dem Herrn, for six voices
 Credo, for five voices
 Miserere, setting of Psalm
 Befestige, o Gott, was du in uns gewirkt hast
 setting of "Vom Himmel hoch, ihr Engel kommt"
 Wanderers Nachtlied after Johann Wolfgang von Goethe, 1921
 Zum neuen Jahr for four-part mixed choir

Lieder 
 Drei Passionsgesänge for voice with organ accompaniment, opus 27, including:
 Es ist vollbracht with additional mixed choir
 O du sonnige, wonnige Welt (Friedrich Wilhelm Weber) for two Sspranos, Opus 1
 Zwei geistliche Gesänge for voice with organ accompaniment, opus 23, including
 Lamentation with four-part boys' choir

Organ pieces 
 Phantasie über den achten Psalmton, Op. 29
 Postludium über "Ite missa est IV"

Further reading 
 Moritz Brosig, Carl Thiel: Handbuch der Harmonielehre und Modulation. 9. Auflage. Verlag F.E.C. Leuckart, Leipzig, 1920.
 Friedrich Wilhelm Sering, Carl Thiel: Chorbuch für Gymnasien, Realgymnasien und Oberrealschulen: Op. 117, Verlag M. Schauenburg, Lahr (Baden), 1922.
 Friedrich Wilhelm Sering, Carl Thiel: Chorbuch für Gymnasien, Realschulen usw., nach den ministeriellen Richtlinien für den Musikunterricht von 1925, Verlag M. Schauenburg, Lahr (Baden), 1928.
 Choräle und geistliche Lieder für den Chor der höheren Lehranstalten, Verlag M. Schauenburg, Lahr (Baden), 1930.
 Carl Thiel, in Die Musikpflege. 8. Jahrgang, 1937 / 1938, issue 4, .
 Carl Thiel, in Die Musikpflege. 10. Jahrgang, 1939 / 1940, issue 7, .

Literature 
 Caecilia, Zeitschrift für katholische Kirchenmusik, issue 3/4, 1932
 August Scharnagl: Die Regensburger Kirchenmusikschule, at Georg Schwaiger (editor): Lebensbilder aus der Geschichte des Bistums Regensburg, BGBR 23/24, Regensburg, 1989/1990, .
 Clemens August Preising: Carl Thiel. Ein Leben für die Musikkultur des deutschen Volkes. Regensburg 1951.
 Franz Fleckenstein (publisher): Gloria Deo Pax Hominibus. Festschrift zum 100-jährigen Bestehen der Kirchenmusikschule Regensburg. (Publication series of the General Cäcilien Association. Volume 9). Bonn 1974.
 Raymond Dittrich (publisher): 125 Jahre Kirchenmusikschule in Regensburg von  zur Reichsstraße. Regensburg 1999.

References

External links 
 
 Carl Thiel in mälzels magazin, 2000, Nummer 3
 Carl Thiel at Carus-Verlag
 

1862 births
1939 deaths
People from Lower Silesian Voivodeship
German choral conductors
German music educators
German composers
20th-century hymnwriters
Knights of St. Gregory the Great